The Zipper is an amusement ride designed by Joseph Brown under Chance Rides in 1968. Popular at carnivals and fairs in the United States, Canada, Australia, Mexico and New Zealand, it features strong vertical G-forces, numerous spins, and a noted sense of unpredictability. Chance Rides had manufactured the ride continuously from 1968 to 2001. In 2015, Chance built a Zipper for Skinner's Amusements. Since its debut, 222 models were produced. Only one of these was specifically designed for an amusement park, Galaxyland, at the West Edmonton Mall in Edmonton, Alberta, Canada. However, it was eventually removed due to constant breakdowns as this ride was not designed for full-time operation.

Most models of the Zipper follow a similar basic format: A long, rotating, oval boom with a cable around its edge that pulls 12 cars around the ride. Except at peak times, most operators will only fill half of the cars at one time with riders. Like most carnival equipment, the ride is designed to be portable; it can be disassembled onto a truck and transported from site to site.

Though a staple of amusement parks and carnivals, the original models of this ride garnered a reputation for being unsafe due to their rough nature, and a series of deaths on the rides in the late 1970s after car doors came unlatched led to a series of revisions, primarily restructuring of the door lock system. Nevertheless, the ride has amassed a cult following over its decades in operation, and was named by Popular Mechanics as one of the strangest amusement park rides in the world.

History
The Zipper was created by Joseph Brown under Chance Rides in 1968 in Wichita, Kansas, and registered under patent 3,596,905 in 1971. The ride's basic design was based on an earlier ride called The Swooper, invented in 1928, which also featured a series of cars being pulled along a cable around an oblong framework. The central difference between The Swooper and the Zipper was the ability of the Zipper's frame to rotate as the cars travel along it by cable.

Description

The Zipper has a long oblong frame (the boom) that rotates like a Ferris wheel, with free-flipping cars suspended on off-center axes that move around the sides of the boom via a pulley system. Each passenger capsule is essentially a bench seat that snugly fits two people, built into a compartment of metal mesh contoured to protect the riders' entire bodies. The odd, apostrophe-shaped capsules, spaced evenly along the perimeter of the boom, look very much like the rows of interlocking teeth on a zipper, the characteristic for which the ride was named.

The passenger capsules travel around the perimeter of the boom at 4 revolutions per minute (rpm), not particularly fast, but the "flip" around the end of the oblong frame causes a sudden burst of speed and sends the compartments flipping end over end. The boom itself rotates at 7.5 rpm in the same direction as the pulley system. This combined but offset rotation provides each capsule with a unique and unpredictable experience. These rides rotate both clockwise and counter-clockwise, and most are run with several rotations in each direction constituting "one ride".

If the riders shift enough body weight in one direction, they may be able to flip the car even when the boom and the attached cable are motionless. Each car allows limited space for riders. The restraint system for the riders are a lap bar and bars to hang on to. Not holding on to this bar when the ride suddenly jerks can cause a rider's head to hit the door in front of them. Riders also have the ability to attempt to shift their weight to try to flip their car as many times as possible during the ride, even with the little extra space available in the car.

Safety issues and revisions

The first fourteen Zippers manufactured spun at much higher speeds than modern models. The boom rotated at 11rpm and the cable system at 7rpm. These first-generation rides kept the passenger compartments spinning on their axes constantly, creating unsafe g-forces and causing impact-related injuries such as whiplash, bruises and back injuries. The safety hazard was quickly discovered and the mechanical rpms were permanently lowered to current speeds.

On September 7, 1977, the U.S. Consumer Product Safety Commission issued a public warning, urging carnival-goers not to ride the Zipper after four deaths occurred due to compartment doors opening mid-ride. The safety restraints being attached to the door itself, riders are left unrestrained whenever the door is open. The four victims all died after falling from their compartments. The failure was traced to original spring-close latches on the doors wearing out and not being replaced. Compartments on currently operating Zippers are secured using the original latch, a redundant latch approved by the CPSC, and a large R-Key pin as a second backup.

Despite these new safety features, the same scenario was repeated in July 2006 in Hinckley, Minnesota, when two teenage girls were ejected from their compartment as the door swung open. Their door was apparently not properly closed by the operator who admitted to local law enforcement that he had not inserted the safety pin (R-Key) before starting the ride. Both of the victims, Erica Matrious and Breanna Larsen, survived the incident despite facing some serious injuries. On November 2, 2006, the girls were interviewed.

Many newer models of Zipper have solved this problem by completely restructuring the door lock system, also eliminating the need for an R-key. These newer models have also increased the weight of the compartments, reducing the spinning, which decreases pressure on the door latches.

Zipper operators are encouraged to employ a "no single rider" policy. The manufacturer's concern was that a person riding alone might turn sideways in the seat and remove their legs from underneath the lap bar, risking serious injury as the capsule spun. The manufacturer sent out a bulletin to Zipper owners in 1995 pointing out the risk.

Ride Specifications
Duration
 Ride duration (recommended): 2 minutes
 Ride duration (maximum): 2.5 minutes

Dimensions
 Maximum height: 
 Total ride weight: 

Passenger detail
 Number of passenger compartments: Anywhere ranging from 4 to 16 seats
 Passengers per seat: 2 adults or 3 children
 Maximum passenger weight per seat: 
 Total passengers: Maximum 24 adults or 36 children (12-seat Zipper)
 Maximum total passenger weight:  (12-seat Zipper)
 Height requirement: 48 Inches (122 cm)

Mechanical speed
 Boom: 7.5 RPM (formerly 11 RPM, see above)
 Cable: 4.0 RPM (formerly 7 RPM, see above)

Direction of travel
 Boom: travels clockwise or counter-clockwise
 Cable: travels clockwise or counter-clockwise

Power requirements
 Boom drive: Electro-hydraulic
 Cable Drive: Electro-hydraulic
 Power rating: 
 Suspension type: Air ride

In popular culture
In 2012, a documentary titled ZIPPER: Coney Island's Last Wild Ride was made, dealing with the ride's eventual removal at Coney Island and the economical reasons behind it.

The ride appears in the opening scene of the 2006 film, Final Destination 3.

Recording artist Michael Jackson operated a Zipper at his Neverland Ranch. He claimed to hold the world record for riding the longest at 35 minutes during the early 2000's. After Jackson's death in 2009, the ride—among several others— was auctioned with his estate, and began traveling with carnivals across the country, advertised as a piece of history.

In the music video for Melanie Martinez's song "Carousel" a Zipper can be seen at a couple of moments throughout the video.

In Diary of a Wimpy Kid: Dog Days, Greg Heffley rides a version of the Zipper called "Cranium Shaker". The ride also appears in the movie version, but the ride is different from its book counterpart, as it is a Skyscraper instead.

The ride appears in the video game Planet Coaster as the thrill ride "Kick Flip". It is billed as "A modern take on a fairground classic."

The ride appears in the 2019 film, Toy Story 4 as seen in the carnival.

The ride appears in Weeds Season 6 Episode 7 "Pinwheels and Whirligigs".

The ride appears in “IT chapter two”

See also

Skydiver (ride)
Swing ride
Rock-O-Plane

References

American inventions
Amusement rides
Upside-down amusement rides
Amusement rides introduced in 1968